The Dome Forest is a forested area of Rodney in the Auckland Region of New Zealand.

Geography 

The forest is an area seven kilometres north-west of the township of Warkworth. A forested area above the Dome Valley, the Dome Forest is dominated by a ridge, the highest point being the 336-metre tall peak known as the Dome. The Te Araroa Trail follows the ridgeline of the forest. The land is formed from erosion-resistant Waitemata sandstone. Along the track is the Waiwhiu Kauri Grove, an area featuring 20 large kauri trees.

History 

The traditional name for the Dome (the peak in the forest) was Tohitohi o Rei, a name referencing the ancestress Reipae of the Tainui migratory waka. Tohitohi o Rei is a location mentioned in a traditional story of Reitū and Reipae. Reipae travelled around the North Island with her sister Reitū on the back of a large bird, rested at the peak.

The forest is primarily owned by the Crown and managed by the Department of Conservation, and includes areas of regenerating native forest.

References 

Forestry in New Zealand
Forests of New Zealand
Landforms of the Auckland Region
Outdoor recreation in New Zealand
Rodney Local Board Area